The Klein Grieshorn (or Piccolo Corno Gries) is a mountain of the Lepontine Alps, located on the Swiss-Italian border. The summit is the tripoint between the cantons of Valais, Ticino and the region of Piedmont.

References

External links
 Klein Grieshorn on Hikr

Mountains of the Alps
Mountains of Piedmont
Mountains of Ticino
Mountains of Valais
Lepontine Alps
Italy–Switzerland border
International mountains of Europe
Ticino–Valais border
Mountains of Switzerland
Two-thousanders of Switzerland